The Albany Port Railroad  operates industrial trackage at the Port of Albany-Rensselaer located to the south of downtown Albany, NY along the Hudson River. Customers include a large Cargill grain facility. The operation is jointly owned by CSX and Canadian Pacific Railway.

Sources

New York (state) railroads
Switching and terminal railroads
Companies based in Albany, New York